The Tagite River is a river of the Philippines. It is one of the five major river systems or tributaries that feed the Cagayan River.

References

Rivers of the Philippines
Landforms of Misamis Oriental